The Bowling at the 1981 Southeast Asian Games was held between 08 December to 12 December at Celebrity Bowl, Manila, Philippines.

Medal summary

Men's

Women's

Medal table

References

1981 Southeast Asian Games events
Southeast Asian Games
1981